"A Little More Love" is a song recorded as a duet by American country music artists Jerrod Niemann and Lee Brice. It was released in April 2016 as the first single from Niemann's fourth studio album, This Ride. The song was written by Shane McAnally, Ross Copperman, Natalie Hemby and Kristi Neumann. The song was Niemann's first single released through Curb Records.

Critical reception
Billy Dukes of Taste of Country reviewed the single with favor, praising its summer vibe, writing The lyrics of “A Little More Love” fit Niemann’s brand of left-of-center country music perfectly, and his delightful exchanges with Brice are off the cuff, loose and inspired. Two singers who didn’t know each other as well as they do could not pull off the chemistry this funky beat is built on.

Chart performance

References

2016 songs
2016 singles
Jerrod Niemann songs
Lee Brice songs
Curb Records singles
Male vocal duets
Songs written by Shane McAnally
Songs written by Ross Copperman
Songs written by Natalie Hemby